Ocypode cordimanus is a species of crab in the family Ocypodidae, sometimes called the smooth-handed ghost crab. It is widely distributed in the Indian Ocean and Pacific Ocean.

References

External links

 

Ocypodoidea
Crustaceans described in 1818